John Edward Schaive (February 25, 1934 – May 11, 2009) was a backup second and third baseman who played in Major League Baseball between the  and  seasons. He was born in Springfield, Illinois.

Schaive spent 14 years in baseball as a player, manager, coach and scout. He signed with the Chicago White Sox in 1952 and started his career in their minor league system. In 1955, he led the Class D Pennsylvania–Ontario–New York League (PONY League) in four offensive categories. The next season, he attended spring training with the Sox' big league camp, but he had to spend two seasons in military service.

When Schaive got back to baseball, he contended he was not the player he once had been and was released by Chicago. Nevertheless, he spent five seasons in the American League, playing from 1958 through 1960 with the original Washington Senators and for the expansion franchise Washington Senators in 1962 and 1963.

In a five-season career, Schaive was a .232 hitter (75-for-323) with seven home runs and 32 RBI in 114 games, including 25 runs, 18 doubles, and one triple without stolen bases.

A .291 hitter in more than 1,100 minor league games, Schaive hit .293 on the Double-A level and .282 in five Triple-A seasons. During his long minor league career, he served as the player-manager of the expansion Senators' York White Roses farm club of the Double-A Eastern League from late May through September 1963.

Schaive died in his hometown of Springfield at the age of 75.

External links

Profile 
Springfield baseball legend Schaive dies

1934 births
2009 deaths
American expatriate baseball players in Mexico
Atlanta Crackers players
Baseball players from Illinois
Broncos de Reynosa players
Charleston Senators players
Chattanooga Lookouts players
Columbus Jets players
Decatur Commodores players
Denver Bears players
Erie Senators players
Jacksonville Suns players
Major League Baseball second basemen
Major League Baseball third basemen
Minor league baseball managers
Sportspeople from Springfield, Illinois
Sultanes de Monterrey players
Thomasville Tomcats players
University of Illinois at Springfield
Washington Senators (1901–1960) players
Washington Senators (1961–1971) players
Wisconsin Rapids White Sox players
York White Roses players